Atherinomorus is a genus of silversides in the family Atherinidae.

Species
There are currently 12 recognized species in this genus:
 Atherinomorus aetholepis Kimura, Iwatsuki & Yoshino, 2002 (Spatular-scale silverside)
Atherinomorus balabacensis (Seale, 1910)
Atherinomorus capricornensis (Woodland, 1961)
 Atherinomorus duodecimalis (Valenciennes, 1835) (Tropical silverside)
 Atherinomorus endrachtensis (Quoy & Gaimard, 1825) (Eendracht Land silverside)
 Atherinomorus forskalii (Rüppell, 1838) (Red Sea hardyhead silverside)
 Atherinomorus insularum (D. S. Jordan & Evermann, 1903) (Hawaiian Islands silverside)
 Atherinomorus lacunosus (J. R. Forster, 1801) (Wide-banded hardyhead silverside)
 Atherinomorus lineatus (Günther, 1872) (Lined silverside)
 Atherinomorus pinguis (Lacépède, 1803) (Narrow-banded hardyhead silverside)
 Atherinomorus regina (Seale, 1910) (Culion silverside)
 Atherinomorus stipes (J. P. Müller & Troschel, 1848) (Hardy-head silverside)
 Atherinomorus vaigiensis (Quoy & Gaimard, 1825) (Ogilby's hardyhead silverside)

Atherinomorus crenolepis is included in this genus by some authorities but Fishbase covers this species as Hypoatherina crenolepis.

References

 
Atherinomorinae